Frank Wynyard Wright (6 April 1844 – 15 February 1924) played first-class cricket for Oxford University and Lancashire, plus other amateur sides, as a middle-order batsman and occasional wicketkeeper in the 1860s. He was born at Woodstock, Oxfordshire, England and died at Eastbourne, Sussex, England. He was the cousin of the England Test cricketer and FA Cup-winning footballer Teddy Wynyard. He was educated at St John's College, Oxford, then became a Church of England priest and was rector of Hedsor, Buckinghamshire, 1870–76.

References

1844 births
1924 deaths
English cricketers
Oxford University cricketers
Lancashire cricketers
North v South cricketers
Gentlemen cricketers
Southgate cricketers
English cricketers of 1826 to 1863
English cricketers of 1864 to 1889
Gentlemen of the North cricketers
Alumni of St John's College, Oxford
19th-century English Anglican priests